Kevin Valentine is an American rock drummer who is best known for being a member of Donnie Iris and the Cruisers. Valentine played drums on all of the band's early albums during the 1980s.
Valentine has recorded as a member of Breathless, The Innocent, Godz, Rosie, Shadow King, The Lou Gramm Band and Neverland.
He also performed (on a session basis) on the Kiss albums Hot In The Shade, Psycho Circus and Revenge, playing on all tracks but one on Psycho Circus. The one track he did not play was "Into the Void", performed by Peter Criss. On Revenge, he played on one song, "Take It Off" and played on "You Love Me to Hate You" on Hot in the Shade. He was also a touring member of Cinderella. Valentine is also a sound mixer for many prominent TV shows, such as The Good Wife, Legion, Better Call Saul,  El Camino: A Breaking Bad Movie, Ozark, and The Nevers.

Discography

With Todd Tamanend Clark 
 Two Thousand Light Years From Home (1975)

With Breathless 
 Breathless (1979)
 Nobody Leaves This Song Alive (1980)
 The Best Of Breathless · Picture This (1993)

With Rosie 
 Live (1988)

With Donnie Iris and the Cruisers 
 Back on the Streets (1980)
 King Cool (1981)
 The High and the Mighty (1982)
 Fortune 410 (1983)
 No Muss...No Fuss (1985)
 Out of the Blue (1992)
 Poletown (1997)
 20th Century Masters: The Best of Donnie Iris (2001)
 25 Years (2004)
 Ellwood City (2006)

With Kiss 
 Hot In The Shade (1989) Drums on "You Love Me to Hate You" and "King of Hearts".
 Revenge (1992) Drums on "Take It Off".
 Psycho Circus (1998) All Drums except for the song “Into The Void”.

With The Innocent 
 Livin' In The Street (1985)

With Godz 
 Mongolians (1987)

With Shadow King 
 Shadow King (1991)
 Highlander II · The Quickening (soundtrack) (1991)

With Neverland 
 Surreal World (1996)

With Graham Bonnet 
 Underground (1997)
 The Day I Went Mad'' (1999)

Awards and nominations

References

Living people
American rock drummers
Kiss (band) personnel
Donnie Iris and the Cruisers members
Musicians from Pittsburgh
Shadow King members
1956 births
20th-century American drummers
American male drummers
The Innocent (band) members